Hardee County is a county located in the Florida Heartland, Central Florida region U.S. state of Florida. As of the 2020 census, the population was 25,327. Its county seat is Wauchula.

Hardee County comprises the Wauchula, FL Micropolitan Statistical Area.

History
It was named for Cary A. Hardee, Governor of Florida from 1921 to 1925.  Hardee County was created in 1921.

On August 13, 2004, Hurricane Charley went directly through Hardee County. Most buildings in the county sustained damage, and many were totally destroyed.

Geography

Hardee County is located in what is known as the "Bone Valley" which contains most of North America's phosphate deposits and a large portion of the world's deposits. Phosphate is mined in large open pit mines with massive settling ponds that contain many harmful byproducts of the mining process and its disposal and use are restricted thus leaving the settling ponds in place indefinitely and rendering the land unfit for agriculture  The Mosaic company currently owns all mining land in Hardee County with around 10,000 acres near Fort Green and is proposing an expansion of around 27,000 acres in a new mine near Ona, FL. There is much controversy over the mining practice, the rezoning and conversion of agricultural land into open pit mines. Land is "reclaimed" after mining but leaves areas of mostly artificially created lakes and wetlands in addition to the slightly poisonous and radioactive settling ponds. The proposed Ona mine would surround Horse Creek, a tributary to the Peace River, thus threatening the very pristine and largely untouched natural waterway as well as the Peace River watershed.

Adjacent counties
 Polk County, Florida - north
 Highlands County, Florida - east
 DeSoto County, Florida - south
 Manatee County, Florida - west
 Hillsborough County, Florida - northwest

Demographics

As of the 2020 United States census, there were 25,327 people, 7,991 households, and 5,838 families residing in the county.

As of the census of 2000, there were 26,938 people, 8,166 households, and 6,255 families residing in the county. There were 9,820 housing units at an average density of 15 per square mile (6/km2). The racial makeup of the county was 70.66% White, 8.33% Black or African American, 0.68% Native American, 0.30% Asian, 0.06% Pacific Islander, 17.99% from other races, and 1.97% from two or more races.  35.68% of the population were Hispanic or Latino of any race.

According to 2005 Census Estimates the county's population was 50.6% non-Hispanic white, 39.8% Latino, 9.0% African-American and 1.3% Native American. (source=https://web.archive.org/web/20110607003625/http://quickfacts.census.gov/qfd/states/12/12049.html

In 2000 there were 8,166 households, out of which 34.90% had children under the age of 18 living with them, 60.00% were married couples living together, 11.10% had a female householder with no husband present, and 23.40% were non-families. 18.00% of all households were made up of individuals, and 9.40% had someone living alone who was 65 years of age or older.  The average household size was 3.06 and the average family size was 3.40.

In the county, the population was spread out, with 27.60% under the age of 18, 11.00% from 18 to 24, 28.30% from 25 to 44, 19.20% from 45 to 64, and 13.90% who were 65 years of age or older.  The median age was 33 years. For every 100 females, there were 119.10 males.  For every 100 females age 18 and over, there were 123.00 males.

The median income for a household in the county was $30,183, and the median income for a family was $32,487. Males had a median income of $23,793 versus $18,823 for females. The per capita income for the county was $12,445.  About 17.00% of families and 24.60% of the population were below the poverty line, including 30.20% of those under age 18 and 16.10% of those age 65 or over.

Politics

Libraries
Hardee County is part of the Heartland Library Cooperative which serves Hardee County and some of the surrounding counties, including Glades, Highlands, Okeechobee, and DeSoto. The seven-branch library system has one branch in Wauchula. Hardee County Public Library and the Heartland Library Cooperative are also members of the Tampa Bay Library Consortium.

Hardee County Public Library was established in the mid-1980s after a group of residents expressed concern that the current small local library was not enough for the growing county. In September 1984 the Board of County Commissioners adopted the Resolution 84-21 that allowed the creation of the Hardee County Public Library. Later in 1997, the Board of County Commissioners signed an inter-local agreement to become a member of the Heartland Library Cooperative. Becoming a member of the Heartland Library Cooperative allows the library more resources and materials for its members. In the summer of 2004, the library building was severely damaged by Hurricane Charley and managed to keep its doors open for a couple of years before ultimately closing in 2006 for much-needed repairs. The library reopened its doors in January 2007. The library went from 5,800 square feet in 1984 to 15,680 square feet in 2007. It circulates an average of 71,251 items per year to 27,652 residents.

In addition to traditional materials and online resources, the Hardee County Public Library is also home to the Florida Advocate and Herald-Advocate (local newspapers) on microfilm as well as Wauchula City Directories from the 1970s-to 1980s. A library card is free for people who reside in Hardee County and other participating counties in the Heartland Library Cooperative.

Cities
 Bowling Green
 Wauchula

Town
 Zolfo Springs

Census-designated places

 Fort Green
 Fort Green Springs
 Gardner
 Lemon Grove
 Limestone
 Ona

Other unincorporated communities

 Crewsville
 Lake Dale
 Oak Grove
 Popash
 Sweetwater Ranch
 Village of Charlie Creek

Transportation

Airports
 Wauchula Municipal Airport

Education
The Hardee County School District has one high school, one junior high, and five elementary schools. Hardee Senior High and Hardee Junior High are in Wauchula.  The elementary schools are Bowling Green, Hilltop, North Wauchula, Wauchula, and Zolfo Springs.

South Florida State College is a public college serving Hardee, Highlands and DeSoto Counties. Its Hardee campus is in Bowling Green.

See also
 Florida Heartland
 National Register of Historic Places listings in Hardee County, Florida

Notes

References

External links

Government links/constitutional offices
 Hardee County Board of County Commissioners official website
 Hardee County Supervisor of Elections
 Hardee County Property Appraiser
 Hardee County Sheriff's Office
 Hardee County Tax Collector

Special districts
 Hardee County Public Schools
 Southwest Florida Water Management District
 Heartland Library Cooperative

Judicial branch
 Hardee County Clerk of Courts  (Official Site)
  Public Defender, 10th Judicial Circuit of Florida serving Hardee, Highlands, and Polk counties
  Office of the State Attorney, 10th Judicial Circuit of Florida
  Circuit and County Court for the 10th Judicial Circuit of Florida

Museum and library resources
 Heartland Library Cooperative. Hardee County is part of the Heartland Library Cooperative
 The Herald-Advocate, the local newspaper for Hardee County, Florida fully and openly available in the Florida Digital Newspaper Library

Other resources
 Photos of Damage from Hurricane Charley at FloridaDisaster.org

 
Florida counties
1921 establishments in Florida
Populated places established in 1921
Micropolitan areas of Florida